Altamira Airport  is the airport serving Altamira, Brazil.

During a transitional period, the airport is jointly operated by Infraero and AENA.

History
The airport was commissioned in 1979.

Due to the construction of nearby Belo Monte Dam, Altamira Airport underwent a major renovation, including the extension of the runway, and enlargement of the apron and passenger terminal. The renovation began by the end of 2011.

Previously operated by Infraero, on August 18, 2022 the consortium AENA won a 30-year concession to operate the airport.

Airlines and destinations

Accidents and incidents
6 June 1990: a TABA Fairchild Hiller FH-227 registration PT-ICA flying from Belém-Val de Cans to Altamira, while on approach to land under fog at Altamira, descended below the approach path, collided with trees and crashed 850m short of the runway. Of the 41 passengers and crew, 23 died.
25 January 1993: a TABA Fairchild Hiller FH-227 registration PT-LCS operating a cargo flight from Belém-Val de Cans to Altamira crashed into the jungle near Altamira during night-time approach procedures. The crew of 3 died.

Access

See also

List of airports in Brazil

References

External links

Airports in Pará
Airports established in 1979